Nice Cycling Team is a Kuwaiti UCI Continental cycling team founded in 2017 and ended later, the same year.

Team roster

References

Cycling teams based in Kuwait
UCI Continental Teams (Asia)
Cycling teams established in 2017